Estíbaliz Martínez Yerro (born 9 May 1980 in Vitoria) is a Spanish rhythmic gymnast and Olympic Champion. She competed at the 1996 Summer Olympics in Atlanta, and won a gold medal with the Spanish group. The team was formed by Estíbaliz, Estela Giménez, Marta Baldó, Nuria Cabanillas, Lorena Guréndez and Tania Lamarca. Also she was two times world champion in 3 balls/2 ribbons.

See also
 List of gymnasts
 List of Olympic medalists in gymnastics (women)
 Gymnastics at the Pan American Games
 World Rhythmic Gymnastics Championships
 Gymnastics at the World Games
 Rhythmic Gymnastics European Championships

Notes

References

External links 
 
 
 
 

1980 births
Living people
Spanish rhythmic gymnasts
Olympic gold medalists for Spain
Gymnasts at the 1996 Summer Olympics
Olympic gymnasts of Spain
Sportspeople from Vitoria-Gasteiz
Olympic medalists in gymnastics
Medalists at the 1996 Summer Olympics
Gymnasts from the Basque Country (autonomous community)
20th-century Spanish women